The Oxford College of Engineering is a college in Bangalore, India, under the VTU Visvesvaraya Technological University recognized by the Government of Karnataka and approved by the All India Council of Technical Education (AICTE), [[New Delhi] (accredited by NBA & NAAC ) recognized by University Grants Commission.

About
Founded in 1974 by Sri S Narasa Raju, the Oxford Educational Institutions is the brain child of the Children's Education Society. The college is set in a 10.5 acres campus and is situated in Bommanahalli, Bengaluru along National Highway N.H. 7. The main Oxford institution is located J.P. Nagar, Bangalore, India.

Departments and courses
The institution has four year undergraduate courses in Architecture, Biotechnology, Civil Engineering, Computer Science And Engineering, Electronics and Communication Engineering, Electrical And Electronics Engineering, Information Science Engineering, Mechanical Engineering, Construction Technology & Management, Automobile Engineering, Mechatronics Engineering

These departments offer three postgraduate courses in Master of Computer Applications(MCA), and Digital Communication and Networking

College Festivals
Milana- Annual Intra Collegiate Cultural festival conducted during even semesters.

Impulse-Techno Cultural fest organized by the Department of CSE.

Oxytech-Techno cultural fest organized by the Department of MCA.It was however conducted jointly by the Departments of MCA and ISE for the 2015 edition named "OXYTECH-2K15".

Clubs and Activities
The Department of CSE runs the activities of the club "TOGGLE". The Oxford Group Of GNU Linux Enthusiasts(TOGGLE) aims at introducing students into open source technologies.

External links
 The Oxford Institutions
 The Oxford College of Engineering
 Unofficial college forum

All India Council for Technical Education
Affiliates of Visvesvaraya Technological University
Engineering colleges in Bangalore
Educational institutions established in 1974
1974 establishments in Karnataka